State Highway 316 (MN 316) is a highway in southeast Minnesota, which runs from its first intersection with U.S. Highway 61 in Welch Township, near Miesville; and continues north to its second intersection with U.S. Highway 61 in the city of Hastings.

Route description
Highway 316 serves as a north–south route in southeast Minnesota between Welch Township and the city of Hastings. The route is located just west of the Mississippi River. Highway 316 and adjacent U.S. 61 are part of the Great River Road.

It is also known as Red Wing Boulevard and Polk Avenue at various points throughout its route.

The southern end of the route passes through the Richard J. Dorer State Forest.

Highway 316 functions as a shortcut along U.S. 61 between Red Wing and Hastings.

The route is legally defined as Route 316 in the Minnesota Statutes.

Most of the highway has a 60 mph speed limit, which was raised from 55 mph in 2017.  Approaching Hastings from the south, the speed limit drops to 45 mph near Michael Avenue, and further drops to 35 mph at Tuttle Drive.

History
Highway 316 was authorized on April 24, 1959.

The route was paved at the time it was marked.

Major intersections

References

External links

Highway 316 at the Unofficial Minnesota Highways Page

316
Transportation in Goodhue County, Minnesota
Transportation in Dakota County, Minnesota
316